Man's Heritage is an early American television series which aired in NTA Film Network syndication in the 1950s. It was a religious program featuring prolific American actor Raymond Massey. Few details about this little-noted series have been recorded. According to McNeil (1996), the series aired during 1956 and was 30 minutes long. However, a 10-minute-long program named Man's Heritage aired during Autumn 1954. In each episode, Mr. Massey would narrate stories from the Bible. The series also aired in parts of Canada.

References

External links

1950s American television series